Stegnaster is a genus of sea stars of the family Asterinidae, endemic to New Zealand. It contains two species:

Species
 Stegnaster inflatus (Hutton, 1872) 
 Stegnaster wesseli (Perrier, 1875)

References

 

Asterinidae